The Volga River is an  river in the U.S. state of Iowa. It is the major tributary of the Turkey River in the northeastern part of the state. The river runs through Fayette and Clayton counties before joining the Turkey River near Elkport.  The Turkey River then runs into the Mississippi River near the town of Cassville, Wisconsin. The Volga River State Recreation Area is a state park along the river near Fayette.

See also
List of Iowa rivers

References

Rivers of Iowa
Rivers of Fayette County, Iowa
Rivers of Clayton County, Iowa